The sign-bearing froglet (Crinia insignifera) is a frog in the family Myobatrachidae. The species was first described by John Alexander Moore in 1954. It is endemic to Australia. Its natural habitats are subtropical or tropical seasonally wet or flooded lowland grassland and swamps. It is threatened by habitat loss.

References

Crinia
Amphibians of Western Australia
Taxonomy articles created by Polbot
Amphibians described in 1954
Frogs of Australia